The following are Filipino films that earned at least 50 million pesos in 2012 during their screenings.

Note

  Box Office Mojo, a reliable third party box office revenue tracker, does not track any revenues earned during any Metro Manila Film Festival editions. So the official figures by film entries during the festival are only estimates taken from any recent updates from credible and reliable sources such as a film's production outfit, or from any news agencies. Also, Metro Manila Development Authority (MMDA) did not release the official gross sales of each of the films. To verify the figures, see individual sources for the references.

Color key

References

Philippines
highest-grossing Filipino films in 2012